Wakajishi Shigenori (born 4 May 1948 as Kozaburo Wada) is a former sumo wrestler from Kamikita, Aomori, Japan. He made his professional debut in May 1964 and reached the top division in January 1973. His highest rank was komusubi. Upon retirement from active competition he became an elder in the Japan Sumo Association. He held many elder names over the years, finding new ones as permanent owners required them. He left the Association in July 1996.

Career record

See also
Glossary of sumo terms
List of past sumo wrestlers
List of sumo tournament second division champions
List of komusubi

References

1948 births
Living people
Japanese sumo wrestlers
Sumo people from Aomori Prefecture
Komusubi